This is a list of Pakistani television and theatre directors.



A

 Angeline Malik
 Ammar Aziz

B
 Bushra Farrukh
 Bilal Lashari

D
 Danish Nawaz

F
 Faisal Qureshi
 Faizan Peerzada
 Farooq Qaiser

H
 Haissam Hussain
 Haseeb Hassan

J
 Javed Sheikh
 Jawad Bashir

M
 M. Akram
 Marina Khan
 Mehreen Jabbar
 Mohammed Ehteshamuddin
 Momina Duraid

N
 Nabeel
 Nabeel Qureshi
 Nadia Afghan
 Noman Masood

R
 Rahat Kazmi
 Rauf Khalid

S
 Savera Nadeem
 Shahid Nadeem
 Shoaib Mansoor
 Sultana Siddiqui

Y
 Yasir Nawaz 
 Yawar Hayat Khan

See also 
 Pakistan Television
 List of Pakistani Actors
 List of Pakistani film directors
 Lollywood

Directors
Pakistani